Por Qué Será (Why Would That Be?) is an album released by Venezuelan performer Rudy La Scala in 1991. The album reached the top ten in the Billboard Latin Pop Albums chart and includes La Scala's second number-one single at the Top Latin Songs.

Track listing
All tracks written and performed by Rudy La Scala.

Chart performance

References

1991 albums
Rudy La Scala albums
Spanish-language albums